All Saints Parish - designated for Polish immigrants in Housatonic, Massachusetts, United States.

 Founded 1913. It is one of the Polish-American Roman Catholic parishes in New England in the Diocese of Springfield in Massachusetts.

In 2009 merged with the Corpus Christi Parish into one.

Bibliography 
 
 The Official Catholic Directory in USA

External links 
 All Saints - ParishesOnline.com
 All Saints - TheCatholicDirectory.com
 Diocese of Springfield in Massachusetts

Roman Catholic parishes of Diocese of Springfield in Massachusetts
Polish-American Roman Catholic parishes in Massachusetts
Churches in Berkshire County, Massachusetts
Great Barrington, Massachusetts